Enzo Basilio (born 3 October 1994) is a French professional footballer who plays as a goalkeeper for the French club Guingamp .

Professional career
Basilio made his professional debut with Dijon in a 3-0 Coupe de la Ligue loss to FC Lorient on 15 December 2015. Basilio spent most of his early career as backup goalkeeper at Dijon, before a couple loans at Quevilly and Rodez. After successful seasons at Concarneau, Basilio joined Guingamp on 30 May 2020.

Career statistics

Personal life
Basilio is of Italian descent, his family having roots in San Severo, Apulia. He is a fan of Juventus F.C.

References

External links
 
 

2000 births
Living people
Sportspeople from Dijon
French footballers
Dijon FCO players
US Quevilly-Rouen Métropole players
Rodez AF players
En Avant Guingamp players
Ligue 2 players
Championnat National players
Championnat National 3 players
Association football goalkeepers
Footballers from Bourgogne-Franche-Comté
French people of Italian descent
20th-century French people
21st-century French people